Gymnoscelis tenera is a moth in the family Geometridae. It was described by William Warren in 1901. It is found in Nigeria and on the Seychelles.

References

Moths described in 1901
tenera
Insects of West Africa
Moths of Africa